IMB is the longest standing building society in New South Wales and the third largest building society in Australia in terms of assets under management.  IMB was established in 1880 as Illawarra Mutual Building Society and is headquartered in Wollongong, New South Wales.

IMB has branches in New South Wales, Victoria and the ACT.

IMB is regulated by the Australian Prudential Regulation Authority, and is a member of COBA, an independent organisation representing building societies and credit unions.

IMB offers home loans, personal loans, savings and transaction accounts, term deposits, business banking, financial planning and a range of insurance products.

See also

 List of companies of Australia
 List of oldest companies in Australia

References

Wollongong
Banks established in 1880
Building societies of Australia
Banks of Australia
Australian companies established in 1880